Citizens of all countries require a visa to visit Afghanistan. The only exemptions are travelers born in Afghanistan, born to Afghan parents or with parents born in Afghanistan.

Following the 2021 takeover of the country by the Taliban, diplomatic missions of Afghanistan set up by the former government, the Islamic Republic of Afghanistan, were instructed by the Taliban to continue their work, and the Taliban government is accepting visas issued by these missions for entry into Afghanistan. Some missions have stopped issuing visas, while others have continued to issue them.

In June 2022, government spokesman Zabiullah Mujahid said: "Anyone can visit Afghanistan for the purpose of humanitarian activities and tourism."

Proposed reform
In February 2015, Afghanistan announced visa-on-arrival facility at Hamid Karzai International Airport for business visitors, journalists, athletes, airline staff and passengers in transit from countries that do not have a diplomatic mission of Afghanistan. In September 2017, some elements of the proposed reform were adopted. On December 10, 2022, the Taliban Ministry of Industry and Commerce opened the "Afghanistan Investment Desk" at Kabul Airport which will facilitate visas on arrival for certain foreign investors.

Visa policy map

Visitors

See also

Visa requirements for Afghan citizens

References

External links
 of the Ministry of Foreign Affairs

Afghanistan
Foreign relations of Afghanistan